Tedrow may refer to:

Places
Tedrow, Ohio
Tedrow Glacier

People with the surname
Al Tedrow (1891–1958), American baseball player
Irene Tedrow (1907–1995), American character actress